is a Japanese tarento. She is a former member of the Japanese idol girl group SKE48 and was a member of Teams E and S.

Career 
Azuma passed Team Crerekko's (a Hokkaido-based idol group) 4th generation auditions in October 2012, but resigned in December 2012. She later applied for SKE48's 6th generation auditions in January 2013 and passed. Her debut was on February 28, 2013.  Her debut stage performance was on March 26, 2013, at SKE48's Kenkyuusei Stage. On April 13, 2013, she was promoted to Team E. This made Azuma the member who spent the shortest period, 18 days, as a trainee member. In February 2014, during the AKB48 Group Shuffle, it was announced she would be transferred to Team S. She first entered SKE48's Senbatsu for the single Mirai to wa?.

Her lightstick colours were pink, black and white.

She graduated from SKE48 on March 31, 2017. She then ended her idol activities, moved back to her hometown of Sapporo and became a local tarento there.

On June 1, 2018, Azuma became affiliated with the Sapporo-based entertainment company CREATIVE OFFICE CUE. She left the agency on September 30, 2022.

Discography

SKE48 singles

AKB48 singles

Appearances

Stage units
SKE48 Kenkyuusei Stage 
 ""
 ""
 ""
 ""
SKE48 Team E 3rd Stage 
 
SKE48 Team S 3rd Stage  (Revival)

References

External links
 CREATIVE OFFICE CUE Official Profile
 
 

1996 births
Living people
Japanese idols
Japanese women pop singers
Musicians from Sapporo
SKE48 members
21st-century Japanese singers
21st-century Japanese women singers